Magdalena Nykiel (born 25 March 1983) is a Polish biathlete. She competed in two events at the 2006 Winter Olympics.

References

1983 births
Living people
Biathletes at the 2006 Winter Olympics
Polish female biathletes
Olympic biathletes of Poland
People from Karkonosze County